R v Zundel [1992] 2 S.C.R. 731 is a landmark Supreme Court of Canada decision where the Court struck down the provision in the Criminal Code that prohibited publication of false information or news on the basis that it violated the freedom of expression provision under section 2(b) of the Canadian Charter of Rights and Freedoms.

Background

The German-born Ernst Zündel (1939–2017) immigrated to Toronto in 1958.  He networked with antisemites and read extensively on antisemitic ideas. He established the publishing house Samisdat Books in his Toronto home in the 1970s to publish Holocaust-denial literature worldwide.

In 1985, Zündel was charged with "spreading false news" by publishing the  pamphlet Did Six Million Really Die? (1974) in Canada, contrary to Section 181 of the Criminal Code.  This section states that "[e]very one who wilfully publishes a statement, tale or news that he knows is false and causes or is likely to cause injury or mischief to a public interest is guilty of an indictable offence and liable to imprisonment".

Zundel was convicted, but on appeal the case was sent back for a new trial due to a procedural error in admitting evidence and instructing the jury. He was re-tried and convicted again in 1988. The judgement was upheld by the Court of Appeal, and Zundel appealed to the Supreme Court.

The issue before the Supreme Court was whether s. 181 (formerly s. 177) of the Code infringed "the guarantee of freedom of expression in s. 2(b) of the Canadian Charter of Rights and Freedoms and, if so, whether s. 181 is justifiable under s. 1 of the Charter".

Opinion of the Court
Justice Beverley McLachlin, writing for a narrow majority of the Court, found that Zundel did violate section 181. The book was examined, and the court concluded that it "misrepresented the work of historians, misquoted witnesses, fabricated evidence, and cited non-existent authorities". However, section 181 violated section 2(b) of the Charter. The dissenting opinion noted that section 2(b) protects all expression of a non-violent form, and as such, the content itself is irrelevant (section 2(b) is content neutral). The protection provided by the Charter includes expression of minority beliefs even where the majority may find it false (Morais 2001). The imposition of imprisonment for expression has a severely limiting effect on freedom, beyond reason. 

McLachlin further found that section 181 could not be justified under section 1 of the Charter as the restriction on all expressions "likely to cause injury or mischief to a public interest" was far too broad. The net result of the decision was that section 181 was "struck down" as being of no force and effect (null and void).

References

Works cited

Further reading

External links

Section Two Charter case law
Canadian freedom of expression case law
Supreme Court of Canada cases
1992 in Canadian case law
Holocaust denial in Canada